The 1998 Oschersleben 500 was the opening round of the 1998 FIA GT Championship season.  It took place at the Motorsport Arena Oschersleben, Germany, on April 12, 1998.

Official results
Class winners are in bold.  Cars failing to complete 70% of winner's distance are marked as Not Classified (NC).

† – #57 Roock Racing was disqualified after failing post-race technical inspection.  The car was found to have an illegal rear wing.

Statistics
 Pole position – #8 Porsche AG – 1:19.335
 Fastest lap – #8 Porsche AG – 1:20.206
 Average speed – 161.087 km/h

References

 
 

O
Oschersleben 500